Hafiz Mehmood Shirani (1880–16 February 1946) was an Indian researcher and poet during the British era and father of Urdu poet Akhtar Sheerani. He started teaching Urdu at Islamia College, Lahore in 1921. In 1928 he moved to Oriental College, Lahore. He was a researcher and his popular theory was "Punjab Mein Urdu" which made him famous. Hafiz Mehmood Khan Shirani died in his native town of Tonk.

Life of Shirani 
Hafiz Mohammad Mahmood Khan Shirani alias Mohammad Michael  was born on October 5, 1880, in Tonk of Rajasthan where his father, Mohammad Ismail Khan held some important poets. His ancestors belonged to the Afghan tribe named Shirani which had come to India with Mahmood Ghaznavi and stayed back in Tonk.  In his child Sherani received religious education; later, he was sent to Jodhpur for learning English and subsequently admitted to Oriental College, Lahore from where obtained the Degree of Munshi Fazil. He developed a taste for poetry and wrote a few poems, including “Tipu Sultan”. Soon he realised that he had the instincts of researcher, linguist and archaeologist, and gave up writing poetry.
After his entrance examination, Shirani was sent to London to study Law in 1904. But the death of his father in 1906 interrupted his education and he had to return home. Family feuds over property saddened him and he returned to England to complete his law studies. It is a difficult period for Shirani, but then something happened that changed the course of his life. He had picked up a book, apparently in a bad shape from an old bookshop. It was a rare book and Lusac and Company paid him a good amount for it. Later he collected two thousand rare volumes which he donated to the Library he had established for the London-based Pan Islamic Society of which he was an active member. Lusac & Company realised his worth and employed him as their collector of antiques. He edited Dr. Hyde’s The Rise and Progress of Islam with a useful appendix and notes which was published by the Company. His interest in legal education gradually diminished and he started devoting more time to the study of scripts, research, ancient history and culture, etc. 
Shirani on his return to India had a stint at teaching as well and for sometime lectured at the Islamic College, Lahore. His research papers now appeared in the noted magazines Makhzan and Urdu. He wrote a number of Papers on daqiqi, Qabusnama and Firdausi’s Shahnama. His critical treatise on Maulana Shibli Naumani’s Shr-ul Ajam earned a name of researcher and critic of extraordinary calibre and erudition. From 1925 onwards, he published his articles in the oriental College magazine. His range of Interest covered both of Urdu and Persian languages and Literatures. At the request of Abdullah Yusufee, he wrote his reputed book Punjab mein Urdu which made him a linguist of no small achievement. The book was published in 1928 by the Anjuman-e-Urdu of Islamic College. In 1928 he became a Lecturer of Urdu Literature at Punjab University. This renowned critic and researcher of Persian and Urdu language & literature, died in Tonk on February 15, 1946.

Works of Shirani 

Books
Tanqid-e-Sherul Ajam
Firdausi par char Maqale
Rise and progress of Mohammedanism
Maqalat-e-Hafiz Mahmood Shirani
khaliqe Bari
Articles
Eusuf va Zulekha-e Firdausi
Firdausi ka mazhab
Hijv Sultan Mahmood Ghaznavi
Farsi Shayeri aur unki qadamat irtebate Aruz
Mirza Ghalib ka kalam Urdu-Farsi
Mathnavi-e Arwatul Wasqi of Shahabi
Hindustan mai Mughlon se qabl farsi Adab
Khazain-ul Futuh az Amir Khosrau
Number of papers on Daqiqi and Qabusnama

Theory About Origin of Urdu 
Hafiz Mehmood Shirani is credited with the theory that says Urdu was born in Punjab. He says since Mahmud of Ghazni had conquered Lahore and Muslims stayed there for some 200 years before invading Delhi, Urdu must have taken shape during that period and, in a way, the Punjabi language gave birth to Urdu. Some two centuries later, Mr Sherani says, Muslim conquerors brought this new language to Delhi with them. He also enlisted some similarities between Urdu and Punjabi.  Shirani was in fact not the first to reach this conclusion and before him some renowned linguists and scholars such as Suniti Kumar Chatterjee, T. Graham Bailey and Mohiuddin Qadri Zor had expressed similar views, however Shirani was the first to try to thoroughly prove the theory.

Sabzwari and Masud Husain Khan proved this theory was incorrect. Aside from historical aspects, they showed that in addition to similarities between the two languages, there were a large number of syntactical and morphological differences that proved that Urdu was not the daughter of Punjabi.

References

External links
 

1880 births
Urdu-language poets
1946 deaths
Urdu-language writers from British India
20th-century Urdu-language writers
Literary critics of Urdu
Urdu-language essayists
Urdu-language letter writers
People from Tonk district
Urdu-language theologians
20th-century poets